Capital Boulevard is a major thoroughfare in Wake County, North Carolina. At various points along the route, it carries NC 50, U.S. Highway 70 (US 70), US 401, and US 1. It links Downtown Raleigh with its northeastern suburbs. It is one of the busiest corridors in Raleigh, with 63 thousand average daily vehicles near its intersection with Interstate 440 (I-440).

Route description

Its southern terminus is at the northern edge of Downtown Raleigh, North Carolina, south of which the roadways continue as a pair of matched one-way streets, Dawson Street (southbound) and McDowell Street (northbound).  At this point the road carries US 401, US 70 and NC 50.  It begins as an urban expressway, with limited driveways and grade-separated interchanges through an industrial area north of Downtown, carrying two through lanes in each direction.   Major interchanges in this area include, from south to north, Peace Street, Wade Avenue (where US 70 West and NC 50 North leave Capital Boulevard), Fairview Road, Wake Forest Road, Atlantic Avenue, and Yonkers Road.  

At an interchange with I-440, it widens to four through lanes in each direction while also transitioning to a divided boulevard-grade roadway with signalized at-grade intersections and frequent driveways.  At the I-440 interchange, US 1 joins going northbound.  The section between I-440 and I-540 is heavily commercial, saturated with shopping centers, anchored by Triangle Town Center, a large shopping mall near the interchange with I-540.  There is one interchange about half-way between I-440 and I-540, where US 401 splits on to Louisburg Road, leaving only US 1 on Capital Boulevard.  North of I-540, the route becomes an arterial divided highway, with two lanes in each direction and a mixture of signalized intersections and grade-separated interchanges as it bypasses to the east of the Wakefield Plantation development of North Raleigh and to the west of the town of Wake Forest.  Major intersections and interchanges in this section include an intersection with Falls of Neuse Road/South Main Street (US 1A) just south of Wake Forest, and two numbered interchanges with NC 98 and NC 98 Business (Exits 124 and 125 respectively).

Capital Boulevard ends at the Wake County line just to the north of Purnell Road, with the US 1 designation continuing on into Youngsville, Franklin County.

History

Capital Boulevard was originally named Downtown Boulevard as far north as its intersection with Wake Forest Road. North of Wake Forest Road, it was known as North Boulevard.

Major intersections

Landmarks

William Peace University
Triangle Town Center
Falls Lake and Falls Lake State Recreation Area

References

Transportation in Wake County, North Carolina
Transportation in Raleigh, North Carolina
U.S. Route 1
U.S. Route 70